Poppy Playtime is an episodic horror video game developed and published by American indie developer Mob Entertainment. The player takes the role of a former employee of toy-making company Playtime Co., who revisits its abandoned toy factory 10 years after its staff's disappearance. The player navigates through a first-person perspective and must solve puzzles, some requiring a gadget named the GrabPack, to progress while avoiding various enemies.

The first chapter was released on Steam for Microsoft Windows on October 12, 2021, and later for Android and iOS on March 11, 2022. The second chapter was released for Microsoft Windows on May 5, and for iOS and Android on August 15. All chapters after the first will be released as downloadable content. The game garnered positive reviews for its gameplay on its initial release, but the second chapter received mixed reviews for its numerous bugs. Additionally, the game developer team Mob Entertainment received harsh criticism for announcing non-fungible tokens of in-game content.

Gameplay 
Poppy Playtime is a horror video game where the player plays as a former employee of Playtime Co. who returns to the abandoned toy factory of said company after receiving a letter from the staff who were thought to have disappeared 10 years ago. The player discovers that the factory is filled with toys who are alive and malicious towards them, and starts looking for a way to escape the premises. Various VHS tapes can be found throughout the factory, each one giving a more in-depth explanation of the story.

The game utilizes multiple puzzles throughout, which the player must solve in order to progress further, with some requiring a gadget named the GrabPack, a backpack that can be equipped with two extendable hands which can be used to pull and reach objects from a far distance, conduct electricity, and access certain doors; in Chapter 2, it can also be used to swing across gaps and, with a green hand obtained during gameplay, transfer electricity between sources.

Plot

Chapter 1 – A Tight Squeeze 
The player receives a package that contains a VHS tape, which shows a commercial for the titular doll Poppy Playtime and tours of the factory before abruptly cutting to spliced-in footage of graffiti of a poppy, and a letter from the missing staff, requesting them to "find the flower". They then enter the abandoned toy factory and, after solving the code to a security door, acquire the GrabPack, which they use to unlock the door to the lobby. After entering the lobby, the player is introduced to Huggy Wuggy, who is on display in the center of the room. While trying to unlock one door in the lobby, the power suddenly cuts, forcing them to restore power in the power room.

After heading back to the lobby, they discover that Huggy has disappeared from his display. The player then restores power to a control panel in order to control an overhead crane and retrieve the right hand of the GrabPack, which they use to unlock a hatch to a conveyor belt that leads to the "Make-a-Friend" section of the factory, where they restore power to the machinery and manufacture a toy. They then place the toy in a scanner and open a door to a hallway which, after the player enters, Huggy suddenly appears from and chases the player through the vents. After reaching a dead-end, the player pulls down a box and breaks part of the conveyor belt, causing Huggy to fall to the bottom of the factory. They then head to the aforementioned graffiti and open a door to a hallway, leading to a room where they find Poppy in a case which the player opens, freeing Poppy.

Chapter 2 – Fly in a Web 
After freeing Poppy from her case, the player explores the back halls of the factory, eventually finding the office of Elliot Ludwig, Playtime's founder. After entering the vents in the office, they encounter Poppy, who thanks them for freeing her and offers to help them escape the factory by giving them a code to activate the factory's train. However, she is grabbed and pulled deeper into the factory. As they approach the Game Station where the train is located, the player encounters Mommy Long Legs, who holds Poppy hostage and takes the red hand from the player's GrabPack. She challenges the player to win the three games in the Game Station, and in return will give the player the code for the train, threatening to kill them if they disobey the rules. Making their way through the factory, the player crafts the green hand for the GrabPack and then proceeds through the three games.

The player is able to obtain two parts of the code before escaping during the third game, fleeing into the tunnels beneath the factory. An enraged Mommy accuses them of cheating and pursues them through the tunnels and back up into the factory until she becomes caught in the teeth of an industrial grinder, killing her. A needle-fingered hand rises to take her broken body away. The player finds Poppy trapped in a spider web with the third part of the code. After freeing her, the player boards the train to escape. However, Poppy diverts the train, saying that she could not let the player leave yet due to the events that had occurred inside the factory, claiming that she knows the player can handle whatever comes next. The train runs out of control and derails near a sign pointing to "Playcare".

Development and release 

Originally starting out as a Kickstarter campaign, the idea of Poppy Playtime was originally thought of by game director Isaac Christopherson, stating that people called most indie horror games 'Walking Simulators', giving Mob Entertainment the idea to "create something with gameplay that doesn't feel quite so run-of-the-mill, while still staying exciting, terrifying, and unique." A trailer for the game's first chapter was uploaded in September 2021.

In an interview with The New York Times, Zach Belanger stated that his idea behind Huggy Wuggy was to "create something entirely new", and that his technique of making him terrifying was by making him larger than everything on screen.

The first chapter was released on Steam for Microsoft Windows on October 12, and later for Android and iOS on March 11, 2022. After the first chapter's release, official merchandise of the game began being released, including T-shirts, posters and plush toys, as well as official collectibles produced by Youtooz.

All chapters after the first will be released as downloadable content. A trailer for Chapter 2, named Fly in a Web, was released on February 22, 2022, with several teasers later being posted to Twitter, including a teaser trailer on April 9. In preparation of the second chapter's release, the first chapter was made free. The second chapter was then released on May 5, for Microsoft Windows and then on August 15, for iOS and Android and is estimated to be thrice as long as the first chapter. A trailer for Chapter 3 was released on August 6, with the chapter expected to be released in 2023.

Reception

Critical response 
Poppy Playtime was well-received upon its initial release, receiving praise for its atmosphere, story, and character design, as well as being compared to the Five Nights at Freddy's franchise, with Screen Rant Austin Geiger calling Poppy Playtime "more engaging" than Security Breach. However, the first chapter has been criticized for its short length, claimed to being roughly 30–45 minutes long, and some initially regarded the game as a Five Nights at Freddy's clone. The game also quickly gained exposure on platforms such as YouTube and Twitch, with videos on the former reaching millions of views, as well as games based on Poppy Playtime appearing on Roblox.

Chapter 2 received mixed reviews on Steam, receiving praise for its voice acting and ending, but also being criticized for its number of bugs and performance issues, including audio issues, crashes, lag, and the so-called "Barry glitch". Mob Entertainment responded with an apology and began rolling out patches for the aforementioned issues.

Controversy 
In December 2021, on Twitter, the developers announced non-fungible tokens of the in-game posters, which was quickly met with backlash and negative reviews from the community, as well as some users requesting refunds, arguing that the developers put lore of the game behind a paywall. In response, the developers deleted the announcement but were unable to remove the NFTs as well due to a contract they had signed, stating that they have to wait for it to expire. On May 3, 2022, Mob Entertainment's CEO Zach Belanger posted a statement on Twitter where he confirms that all profits earned from the NFTs would be going to the Clean Air Task Force organization.

Around Poppy Playtime release, developer Ekrcoaster claimed that Mob Entertainment plagiarized his game Venge. In the aforementioned statement, Belanger denied the allegations, stating that the claims were based around 'past drama' from 2017.

Dorset Police and Lafayette County Sheriff's Department both released a statement to parents regarding the character Huggy Wuggy on March 22, 2022, and April 7, respectively, claiming that due to the character's name, various videos were not being blocked by "firewalls" and filtered by parental filters on various platforms, including TikTok and YouTube Kids. The former also claimed that various schools in the United Kingdom reported children recreating a game where one child hugs another and then whispers sinister things into the recipient's ear. It was also reported that a child had attempted to jump out of a window to mimic the character, and that Luxemburg-Casco School District had received complaints from students claiming they could not sleep due to the character. Fact-checking website Snopes confirmed that while there had been reports from parents within the United Kingdom, the police had incorrectly claimed that the character sang songs, despite said songs being fan-made and not appearing in-game. Snopes had also said that inappropriate videos involving the character were not available for younger users on TikTok and YouTube Kids, with spokespersons for each platform confirming so. Belanger also commented on the situation, calling the warnings "completely untrue and/or grossly exaggerated".

In September 2022, El Observador reported that seven children at a school in Uruguay played a game based on Poppy Playtime that instructed them to commit self-harm using pencil sharpeners, with two being hospitalized as a result. The president of the Institute of Children and Adolescents of Uruguay, Pablo Abdala, states that the incident "confirms that technological development entails a very severe risk".

Spin-off

Project: Playtime
On October 31, 2022, Project: Playtime, a free-to-play co-op horror game that is a spin-off of Poppy Playtime, was announced and was released as early access on Steam on December 12, 2022, missing its original set date of December 6 due to "server backend issues". Six players are assigned as Survivors while another player is given the role of the Monster, which can either be Huggy Wuggy, Mommy Long Legs, or a new jack-in-the-box-themed character called Boxy Boo. Survivors are tasked with retrieving toy parts in order to assemble a large toy, while the Monster is tasked with finding the Survivors and killing them.

Film adaptation
In April 2022, according to Deadline Hollywood, Mob Entertainment partnered with Studio71 to produce a film adaptation of the video game. They reportedly sought to bring Roy Lee into the project.

Merchandise 
In November 2022, the sale of the Huggy Wuggy plush toys was banned by the Turkish Ministry of Trade, stating that the toys "do not meet the requirements of the Toy Safety Regulation." Ministry of Family and Social Services also said it determined that the toy "had a negative effect on the psychosocial development of children."

In early 2023, Huggy Wuggy plush toys – both licensed and unlicensed – were highly in demand with toy sellers worldwide. The toys' popularity was fueled by demand from children who encountered the character on YouTube.

References 

2021 video games
2020s horror video games
Windows games
First-person video games
Single-player video games
Puzzle video games
Unreal Engine games
Indie video games
Video games about toys
Android (operating system) games
IOS games
Video games developed in the United States
Video game controversies
Episodic video games